Rock en Español may refer to:

 Rock en español, Spanish-language rock music
 Rock en Español: Lo Mejor de Cuca, a 2001 album by Cuca
 Rock en Español, Vol. 1, a 2007 album by Los Straitjackets